Asenath Barzani (1590–1670), was a Kurdish Jewish female rabbinical scholar and poet who lived near Duhok, Kurdistan.

Biography

Family background 
Asenath was born into the Barzani family, a well-known Jewish family in northern Kurdistan, in 1590. Her grandfather, Netanel Halevi, was a rabbi and the leader of the Jewish community in Mosul, and considered to be a holy man in the local Jewish community and its environs. Due to the honor of his teachings, he was addressed as adoni (Hebrew, "my lord"). His son and Asenath's father, Rabbi Shemuel Barzani, a rabbi and mystic, was troubled by the status of the Torah among the Jews of Kurdistan, and by the lack of spiritual leaders and halakhic decisors. He established a number of yeshivas in Barzan, Akre, Amadiya and in Mosul, in order to cultivate wise students who could serve the public as rabbis, cantors, and kosher slaughterers. The education of such students were supported by donations from Jewish philanthropists.

Life 
As Shemuel had no sons, he taught his daughter Torah and Talmud to prepare her as his successor. According to Asenath herself, she did not learn any other craft, trade, or vocation, as she spent all her time learning Torah. She described her upbringing as such: 

Barzani was married to her cousin Rabbi Ya'aqov Mizraḥi, who promised her father that she would do no domestic work and could spend her time as a Torah scholar. Barzani wrote:

After Barzani's father's death, her husband became head of the yeshivah in Mosul. He was so involved in his own studies that she essentially taught the yeshivah students and provided them with rabbinic training herself. Following her Ya'aqov's death, the leadership of the yeshivah passed to her, and eventually she became known as the chief teacher of Torah. As neither her father nor her husband had been successful fundraisers, the yeshivah was always in financial difficulties, and Barzani wrote a number of letters requesting funds in which she described her and her children's difficult situation. Her home and belongings had been confiscated, including her books, but she felt that as a woman it would be inappropriate for her to travel in search of financial support.
 
In spite of the financial problems, Barzani's leadership of the yeshivah was successful: it continued to produce serious scholars, including her son, whom she sent to Baghdad, where he continued the dynasty of rabbinic scholars. Her few extant writings demonstrate a complete mastery of the Hebrew language, Torah, Talmud, Midrash, as well as Kabbalah, and her letters display not only learnedness, but also a skill for lyrical prose. 
After her death, many Jews made pilgrimages to her grave in Amadiyah in Northern Iraq, where her father is also buried.

Title and Status
The title of Tanna'it, and her role as head of a yeshiva, is not equivalent to being a rabbi, and hence she is regarded as a rare example of a female rabbinical teacher, rather than a rabbi per se, or a rabbinic authority figure such as a posek or dayan. At the time during which Barzani lived, the concept of rabbinic ordination (semikha) was in flux and a unified agreement of the requirements and rituals for semikha across the Jewish world did not exist.

Poetry 
In addition to her religious scholarship, Barzani was also known as a poet. She is said to have authored a piyyut (liturgical poem) in Kurdish, called Ga’agua L’Zion ("Longing for Zion", in Hebrew).

Legends
There are many stories and legends about Barzani and miracles she performed, including the one described in “A Flock of Angels”.

In local folklore, her gender plays a central role (though in her actual life, she seems to have experienced few obstacles). Many of the stories which allude to her supernatural powers were found in segulot (protective amulets, charms, or rituals). These include her ability to limit her childbearing to two children so that she could devote herself to her studies, and the ability to ward off an intruder in order to prevent him from raping her by loudly calling out holy names.

A Flock of Angels
According to the legend, her father often appeared in Barzani's dreams, revealing dangers to her and telling her how to avert them. On one such occasion, she went to Amêdî where she convinced the local Jews to celebrate Rosh Hodesh (the new moon festival) outdoors, as had been their custom before they were threatened by hostile gentiles.

As they proceeded with the celebration, there were shouts and they saw flames shoot up into the sky. The synagogue had been set on fire, with all the sacred books and scrolls in it. After Barzani whispered a secret name she had learned from her father, the people saw a flock of angels descending to the roof of the synagogue. The angels beat the flames with their wings, until every last spark had been put out. Then they rose up into the heavens like a flock of white doves and were gone. And when the smoke cleared, everybody saw that not only none of the Jews had been hurt since the congregation had been outdoors, but that another miracle had taken place: the synagogue had not burned, nor were any of the Torah scrolls touched by the flames. After that miracle, the Jews of Amêdî were not harassed by the gentiles for a long time. Gratefully, they renamed the synagogue after her, and the legend ends with the words "and it is still standing today".

See also
Timeline of women rabbis

References

Further reading
 Asenath Barzani. "Asenath's Petition", First published in Hebrew by Jacob Mann, ed., in Texts and Studies in Jewish History and Literature, vol.1, Hebrew Union College Press, Cincinnati, 1931. Translation by Peter Cole.
 Shirley Kaufman, Galit Hasan-Rokem, Tamar Hess. Defiant Muse: Hebrew Feminist Poems from Antiquity: A Bilingual Anthology, Feminist Press, 1999, . (see page 7 and “Asenath's Petition” page 66).
 Yoel Bin-Nun, Daniel Sperber, Joshua Maroof. Responsa Regarding Women's Roles in Religious Leadership, March 22, 2009, p. 2.
 Erich Brauer. The Jews of Kurdistan, ed. Raphael Patai. Wayne State University Press, Detroit 1993, first published 1947, 
 Tirzah Firestone. The Receiving: Reclaiming Jewish Women's Wisdom. HarperCollins, 2004, .
 Avraham Grossman. Pious and Rebellious: Jewish Women in Medieval Europe. Brandeis University Press, 2004, p. 163.
 Jacob Mann. Texts and Studies in Jewish History and Literature. Vol. I. New York, 1972.
 Uri Melammed and Renée Levine. Rabbi Asnat: A Female Yeshiva Director in Kurdistan, Pe’amim 82 (2000), pp. 163–178 (Hebrew)).
 Yona Sabar, The Folk Literature of the Kurdistani Jews. Yale University Press, New Haven 1982, .

1590 births
1670 deaths
Kurdish Jews
Kurdish poets
Kurdish women poets
Kurdish educators
Kurdish women educators
Writers from Mosul
17th-century rabbis from the Ottoman Empire
Jewish women writers
17th-century Jews
Women rabbis and Torah scholars
17th-century women from the Ottoman Empire
Kurdish-language poets
17th-century Kurdish people